New York's 3rd State Senate district is one of 63 districts of the New York State Senate. It has  been represented by Republican Alexis Weik since 2021, following her defeat of Democratic incumbent Monica Martinez in the 2020 election.

Geography
District 3 covers much of south-central Suffolk County on Long Island, including portions of Brookhaven and Islip. Most of Brentwood, the largest census-designated place on Long Island, is located within the district.

The district overlaps with New York's 1st and 2nd congressional districts, and with the 1st, 2nd, 3rd, 5th, 6th, 7th, and 8th districts of the New York State Assembly.

Recent election results

2020

2018

2016

2014

2012

Federal results in District 3

References

03